Firefox was created by Dave Hyatt and Blake Ross as an experimental branch of the Mozilla browser, first released as Firefox 1.0 on November 9, 2004. Starting with version 5.0, a rapid release cycle was put into effect, resulting in a new major version release every six weeks. This was gradually accelerated further in late 2019, so that new major releases occur on four-week cycles starting in 2020.

Current and future releases

Current supported official releases 
Firefox 111.0
Firefox 102.9.0 ESR

Current supported test releases 
Firefox 112.0 Developer Edition
Firefox 112.0 Beta
Firefox 113.0 Nightly

Future official releases 
Rapid
Firefox 112.0
Firefox 113.0
Firefox 114.0
Firefox 115.0
Firefox 116.0
Firefox 117.0
Firefox 118.0
Firefox 119.0
Firefox 120.0
Firefox 121.0

ESR
Firefox 102.10 ESR
Firefox 102.11 ESR
Firefox 102.12 ESR
Firefox 102.13 ESR
Firefox 102.14 ESR
Firefox 102.15 ESR
Firefox 115.0 ESR
Firefox 115.1 ESR
Firefox 115.2 ESR
Firefox 115.3 ESR
Firefox 115.4 ESR
Firefox 115.5 ESR
Firefox 115.6 ESR

Future test releases 
Firefox 113.0 Developer Edition
Firefox 113.0 Beta
Firefox 114.0 Nightly
Firefox 114.0 Developer Edition
Firefox 114.0 Beta
Firefox 115.0 Nightly
Firefox 115.0 Developer Edition
Firefox 115.0 Beta
Firefox 116.0 Nightly
Firefox 116.0 Developer Edition
Firefox 116.0 Beta
Firefox 117.0 Nightly
Firefox 117.0 Developer Edition
Firefox 117.0 Beta
Firefox 118.0 Nightly
Firefox 118.0 Developer Edition
Firefox 118.0 Beta
Firefox 119.0 Nightly
Firefox 119.0 Developer Edition
Firefox 119.0 Beta
Firefox 120.0 Nightly
Firefox 120.0 Developer Edition
Firefox 120.0 Beta
Firefox 121.0 Nightly
Firefox 121.0 Developer Edition
Firefox 121.0 Beta
Firefox 122.0 Nightly
Firefox 122.0 Developer Edition
Firefox 122.0 Beta
Firefox 123.0 Nightly

Early versions

Rapid releases 
In April 2011, the development process was split into several "channels", each working on a build in a different stage of development. The most recent available build is called "Nightly Builds" and offers the latest, untested features and updates. The "Aurora" build is up to six weeks behind "Nightly" and offers functionality that has undergone basic testing. As of version 35, the "Aurora" channel has been renamed to the "Developer Edition" channel. The "Beta" channel is up to six weeks behind the "Aurora" build, for up to about twelve weeks compared to the most recent "Nightly" build. The "Beta" channel provides improved stability over the "Nightly" builds and is the first development milestone that has the "Firefox" logo. "Release" is the current official version of Firefox. Gecko version numbering is the same as the Firefox build version number, starting with 5.0 on Firefox 5.

The stated aim of this faster-paced process is to get new features to users faster. This accelerated release cycle was met with criticism by users, as it often broke add-on compatibility, as well as those who believe Firefox was simply trying to increase its version number to compare with other browsers such as Google Chrome.

Firefox 5 through 9 
Firefox 5 was released on June 21, 2011, three months after the major release of Firefox 4. Firefox 5 is the first release in Mozilla's new rapid release plan, matching Google Chrome's rapid release schedule and rapid version number increments. Firefox 5 has significantly improved the speed of web-related tasks, such as loading pages with combo boxes or MathML. Mozilla also integrated the HTML5 video WebM standard into the browser, allowing playback of WebM videos.

Firefox 6 was released on August 16, 2011, introducing a permissions manager, new address bar highlighting (the domain name is black while the rest of the URL is gray), streamlining the look of the site identity block, a quicker startup time, a ScratchPad JavaScript compiler, and many other new features. This update also brought the infamous feature that caused JavaScript entered in the address bar to not run.

Firefox 7 was released on September 27, 2011, and uses as much as 50% less RAM than Firefox 4 as a result of the MemShrink project to reduce Firefox memory usage.

Firefox 7.0.1 was released a few days later, fixing a rare, but serious, issue with add-ons not being detected by the browser. Some URLs are trimmed in the address bar, so the "http://" scheme no longer appears, but "https://" is still displayed. Trailing slashes on domains are also hidden, for example: https://www.example.org/ becomes https://www.example.org.

Firefox 8 was released on November 8, 2011 and prompts users about any previously installed add-ons. Upon installation, a dialog box prompted users to enable or disable the add-ons. Add-ons installed by third-party programs were disabled by default, but user-installed add-ons were enabled by default. Mozilla judged that third-party-installed add-ons were problematic, taking away user control, lagging behind on compatibility and security updates, slowing down Firefox startup and page loading time, and cluttering the interface with unused toolbars.

Firefox 9 was released on December 20, 2011, includes various new features such as Type Inference, which boosts JavaScript performance up to 30%, improved theme integration for Mac OS X Lion, added two-finger swipe navigation for Mac OS X Lion, added support for querying Do Not Track status via JavaScript, added support for font-stretch, improved support for text-overflow, improved standards support for HTML5, MathML, and CSS, and fixed several security problems. It also features a large list of bug fixes.

Firefox 10 through 16 
Firefox 10 and Firefox ESR 10 were released on January 31, 2012. Firefox 10 added a full screen API and improved WebGL performance, support for CSS 3D Transforms and for anti-aliasing in the WebGL standard for hardware-accelerated 3D graphics. These WebGL updates mean that more complex site and Web app animations can render smoothly in Firefox, and that developers can animate 2D objects into 3D without plug-ins. It also introduced a new CSS Style Inspector, which allow users to check out a site's structure and edit the CSS without leaving the browser. Firefox 10 assumed all add-ons made for at least Firefox 4 were compatible. The add-on developer is able to alert Mozilla that the add-on is incompatible, overriding compatibility with version 10 or later. This new rule also does not apply to themes.

Firefox 10 ESR is the first Extended Support Release (ESR) as previously on January 10, 2012, where the Mozilla Foundation announced the availability of an ESR version of Firefox. Firefox ESR is intended for groups who deploy and maintain the desktop environment in large organizations such as universities and other schools, county or city governments and businesses. During the extended cycle, no new features will be added to a Firefox ESR; only high-risk/high-impact security vulnerabilities or major stability issues will be corrected.

Firefox 11 was released on March 13, 2012. Firefox 11 introduced many new features, including migration of bookmarks and history from Google Chrome, SPDY integrated services, Add-on Sync, redesigned HTML5 video controls, and the Style Editor (CSS). The update also fixed many bugs, and improved developer tools.

Firefox 12 was released on April 24, 2012. Firefox 12 introduced few new features, but it made many changes and laid the ground work for future releases. Firefox 12 for Windows added the Mozilla Maintenance Service which can update Firefox to a newer version without a UAC prompt. It also added line numbers in the "Page Source" and centered find in page results. There were 89 improvements to Web Console, Scratchpad, Style Editor, Page Inspector, Style Inspector, HTML view and Page Inspector 3D view (Tilt). Many bugs were fixed, as well as many other minor under-the-hood changes. Firefox 12 is the final release to support Windows 2000 and Windows XP RTM & SP1.

Firefox 13 was released on June 5, 2012. Starting with this version, Windows support was exclusively for Windows XP SP2/SP3, Windows Vista, and Windows 7. Firefox 13 adds and updates several features, such as an updated new tab and home tab page. The updated new tab page is a feature similar to the Speed Dial already present in Opera, Google Chrome, Apple Safari, and Internet Explorer. The new tab page will display nine of the user's most visited websites, along with a cached image. In addition to the updated new tab and home tab page, Mozilla has added a user profile cleaner/reset, reduced hang times, and implemented tabs on demand. The user profile cleaner/reset provides a way for users to fix Firefox errors and glitches that may occur. Mozilla's tabs on demand restores tabs that were open in the previous session, but will keep the tabs unloaded until the user requests to view the page.

Firefox 14 was released on June 26, 2012, for mobile devices only, just outside the regular release schedule of the web browser. In order to sync the version numbers of the desktop and mobile versions of Firefox, Mozilla decided to release version 14.0.1 for both mobile and desktop on July 17, 2012, instead of Firefox 14 version 14.0 for the desktop and version 14.0.1 for mobile devices.

Firefox 14 introduces a new hang detector (similar to how Mozilla currently collects other data) that allows Mozilla to collect, analyze, and identify the cause of the browser freezing/hanging. Mozilla uses this information to improve the responsiveness of Firefox for future releases. In addition to tackling freezing and not-responding errors that occur because of Firefox, Mozilla implemented opt-in activation for plugins such as Flash and Java. Mozilla wants to reduce potential problems that could arise through the unwanted use of third-party applications (malware, freezing, etc.).

Firefox 15 was released on August 28, 2012, with a "Responsive Design View" developer tool, adds support for the Opus audio format, and adds preliminary native PDF support (disabled by default).

Firefox 15 introduced silent updates, an automatic update that will update Firefox to the latest version without notifying the user, a feature that the web browsers Google Chrome and Internet Explorer 8 and above have already implemented, although the user was able to disable that function. The startup time in Firefox 15 was improved for Windows users.

Firefox 16 was released on October 9, 2012, fixing outstanding bugs of the new features in Mac OS X Lion. There were improvements made to startup speed when a user wants to restore a previous session. Support for viewing PDF files inline was added in placement of a plugin. Support for web apps was added. Opus audio format is now enabled by default.

The roll-out of Firefox 16 revision 16.0.0 was stopped on October 10, 2012, after Mozilla detected a security flaw and recommended downgrading to 15.0.1 until the issue could be fixed. The security flaw was fixed in version 16.0.1, which was released the following day, October 11, 2012.

Firefox 17 through 23 

Firefox 17 and Firefox ESR 17 were released on November 20, 2012. It was not planned to bring as many user-facing features as previous releases, it brings improved display of location bar results, improvements to the silent update mechanism for users with incompatible add-ons, and refinements to the Click-To-Play system introduced in Firefox 14. A new feature for developers, an HTML tree editor is also included. Firefox 17 is the first version of the browser that uses SpiderMonkey 17.

Starting with Firefox 17, Mac OS X support is exclusively for Snow Leopard, Lion, and Mountain Lion.

Firefox 18 was released on January 8, 2013. A new feature for Firefox 18 is IonMonkey, Mozilla's next generation JavaScript engine, it also uses some functions of WebRTC.

Firefox 19 was released on February 19, 2013, featuring a built-in PDF viewer.

Firefox 20 was released on April 2, 2013, introduced a panel-based download manager, along with H.264 decoding on the <video> tag (on Windows only), and per-window private browsing (per-tab private browsing on Android). It also includes a new developer toolbox, that combines all developer tools into one panel.

Firefox 21 was released on May 14, 2013. The Social API now supports multiple providers, and an enhanced three-state UI for Do Not Track (DNT).

Firefox 22 was released on June 25, 2013. WebRTC is now enabled by default.
Partial CSS Flexbox support was added (flex-wrap support was scheduled for Firefox 28). A new feature for Firefox 22 was OdinMonkey, Mozilla's next generation JavaScript engine.

Firefox 23 was released on August 6, 2013. It includes an updated Firefox logo, mixed content blocking enabled by default to defend against man-in-the-middle attacks, implementation of the <input type="range"> form control attribute in HTML5, dropping support for the <blink> HTML element as well as the text-decoration:blink CSS element, the restriction to have to "switch to a different search provider across the entire browser", and a global browser console, a new network monitor among other things. JavaScript is automatically enabled by the update, without regard to the previous setting, and the ability to turn it off has been removed from the interface; the "contentious" change was made because many websites depend on JavaScript and it was felt that users unaware that they had disabled JavaScript were attributing the resulting unpredictable layout to software bugs in Firefox.

Firefox 24 through 30 

Firefox 24 and Firefox 24 ESR were released on September 17, 2013. The release includes support for the new scrollbar style in Mac OS X 10.7 (and newer), closing tabs to the right, an improved browser console for debugging, and improved SVG rendering, among other things. It is the first version of the browser that uses SpiderMonkey 24.

Firefox 25 was released on October 29, 2013. Firefox 25 Nightly was at one point slated to include the Australis theme, but Australis did not actually land on Nightly until Firefox 28, did not make it to Firefox 28 Aurora channel, and was finally available with Firefox 29. This release added support for <iframe srcdoc> attribute, background-attachment:local in CSS, along with Web audio API support, a separate find bar for each tab and many other bug fixes.

Firefox 26 was released on December 10, 2013. Firefox 26 changed the behavior of Java plugins to "click-to-play" mode instead of automatically running them. It also added support for H.264 on Linux, password manager support for script-generated fields, and the ability for Windows users without advanced write permissions to update Firefox, as well as many bug fixes and developer-related changes.

Firefox 27 was released on February 4, 2014. It adds improved Social API and SPDY 3.1 support, as well as enabling of TLS 1.1 and 1.2 by default after having been tested through a toggle in about:config since version 24, released on September 17, 2013. Also, it brings many bug fixes, security improvements, and developer-related changes.

Firefox 28 was released on March 18, 2014. It added support for VP9 video decoding and support for Opus in WebM. For Android, features such as predictive lookup from the address bar, quick share buttons and support for OpenSearch were added.

Firefox 29 was released on April 29, 2014, and includes the Australis interface, it also removes the add-on bar and moves its content to the navigation bar. Additionally, it introduced automatic correction of protocol typos to the address bar, meaning that, for example, ttps:// is automatically corrected to https://.

Firefox 30 was released on June 10, 2014. It adds support for GStreamer 1.0 and a new sidebar button, and most plugins are not activated by default.

Firefox 31 through 37 
Firefox 31 and Firefox 31 ESR were released on July 22, 2014. Both versions added search field on the new tab page and were improved to block malware from downloaded files, along with other new features. Firefox 31 ESR is the first ESR to include the Australis interface, unifying the user experience across different Firefox versions. Firefox 24.x.x ESR versions would be automatically updated to ESR version 31 after October 14, 2014.

Firefox 32 was released on September 2, 2014. It shows off HTTP caching improvements, adds HiDPI/Retina support in the Developer Tools UI and widens HTML5 support, among other things.

Firefox 33 was released on October 14, 2014. It now has off-main-thread compositing (OMTC) enabled by default on Windows (which brings responsiveness improvements), OpenH264 support, search suggestions on about:home and about:newtab, address bar search improvements, session restore reliability improvements, and other changes.

Firefox 33.1 was released on November 10, 2014, celebrating Firefox's 10-year anniversary. Firefox 33.1.1 was released for desktop only on November 14, 2014, fixing a startup crash.

Firefox 34 was released on December 1, 2014. It brings Firefox Hello (a WebRTC client for voice and video chat), an improved search bar, and the implementation of HTTP/2 (draft14) and ALPN, together with other features. It also disables SSLv3, and enables the ability to recover from a locked Firefox process and to switch themes and personas directly in the customization mode.

Firefox 35 was released on January 13, 2015. It brings support for a room-based conversations model to the Firefox Hello chat service, and other functions, it also includes security fixes.

Firefox 36 was released for desktop on February 24, 2015, bringing full HTTP/2 support and other smaller improvements and fixes. It was also released for Android three days later on February 27, 2015, adding support for the tablet user interface.

Firefox 37 was released on March 31, 2015, bringing a heartbeat user rating system, which provides user feedback about the Firefox, and improved protection against website impersonation via OneCRL centralized certificate revocation. Also, Bing search is changed to use HTTPS for secure searching, and added is support for opportunistic encryption of the HTTP traffic where the server supports HTTP/2's AltSvc feature.

Firefox 38 through 44 
Both Firefox 38 and Firefox 38 ESR were released on May 12, 2015, with new tab-based preferences, Ruby annotation support and availability of WebSockets in web workers, along with the implementation of the BroadcastChannel API and other features and security fixes.

Firefox 39 was released on July 2, 2015, for desktop and Android, disabling insecure SSLv3 and RC4, improving performance for IPv6 fallback to IPv4 and including various security fixes. Firefox 39.0.3 was released on August 6, 2015, to fix a zero-day exploit.

Firefox 40 was released on August 11, 2015, for desktop and Android. On Windows 10, the Australis theme was updated to reflect the overall appearance of Windows 10, and the interface is adapted for usability on touchscreens when used in the operating system's "Tablet mode". Firefox 40 includes additional security features, including the filtering of pages that offer potentially unwanted programs, and warnings during the installation of unsigned extensions; in future versions, signing of extensions will become mandatory, and the browser will refuse to install extensions that have not been signed. Firefox 40 also includes performance improvements, such as off-main-thread compositing on Linux.

Firefox 41 was released on September 22, 2015, for desktop and Android. Among many additions are the ability to set a profile picture for a Firefox account, enhanced IME support using Text Services Framework, and instant messaging on Firefox Hello.

Firefox 42 was released on November 3, 2015, for desktop and Android. Among many additions are private browsing with tracking protection, IPv6 support in WebRTC, and the ability to view HTML source in a tab.

Firefox 43 was released on December 15, 2015, for desktop and Android. Among many additions are the availability of the 64-bit version for Windows 7 and above, a new strict blocklist, and audio indicators on Android.

Firefox 44 was released on January 26, 2016, for desktop and Android. Among many additions are the improvement of warning pages for certificate errors and untrusted connections, enabling of H.264 and WebM/VP9 video support on systems that don't support MP4/H.264, support for the brotli compression format via HTTPS content-encoding, and the use of Android print service to enable cloud printing. "Ask me every time" cookies option was removed without any notifications.

Firefox 45 through 51 
Firefox 45 and Firefox 45 ESR were released on March 8, 2016, for desktop (both) and Android (no ESR). Among many additions were Instant Browser sharing through Hello, the addition of Guarani locale, the ability to filter snapshot output in memory tool, and the removal of the Tab Groups (panorama) feature.

Firefox 46 was released on April 26, 2016, for both desktop and Android. Among the many additions were improved security of the JavaScript Just In Time (JIT) Compiler, the GTK3 integration (Linux only), HKDF support for Web Crypto API, and removal of support for Android 3.0 (Android only).

Firefox 47 was released on June 7, 2016, for both desktop and Android. Among the many additions were support for Google's Widevine CDM on Windows and Mac OS X so streaming services like Amazon Video can switch from Silverlight to encrypted HTML5 video; enabling VP9 video codec for users with fast machines; the ability of embedded YouTube videos to play with HTML5 video if Flash is not installed; and the addition of the Latgalian language. It is also the last Firefox version to support Android 2.3.x.

Firefox 48 was released on August 2, 2016, for both desktop and Android. Among the many additions were enhanced download protection and the removal of the Windows Remote Access Service modem Autodial. It was also the first official release with "Electrolysis" (multi-process Firefox, meaning that the interface and web pages are running in separate processes in the computer) was enabled.

Firefox 48 is the last Firefox version to support Mac OS X Snow Leopard, Mac OS X Lion, and OS X Mountain Lion. Additionally, support for old processors without SSE2 extensions such as the AMD Athlon XP and Pentium III was dropped.

Firefox 49 was released on September 20, 2016, for both desktop and Android. Among the many additions were an updated Firefox Login Manager, improved video performance for users on systems that support SSE3 without hardware acceleration, added context menu controls to HTML5 audio and video that let users loop files or play files at 1.25x speed, improvements in about:memory reports for tracking font memory usage, and the removal of Firefox Hello. The macOS version now requires at least OS X Mavericks, and the Microsoft Windows version requires a CPU which supports SSE2.

Firefox 50 was released on November 15, 2016, for both desktop and Android. Among the many additions were playback video on more sites without plugins with WebM EME Support for Widevine on Windows and Mac, improved performance for SDK extensions or extensions using the SDK module loader; download protection for a large number of executable file types on Windows, Mac OS, and Linux, increased availability of WebGL to more than 98 percent of users on Windows 7 and newer (desktop), and support for HLS videos via player overlay (Android).

Firefox 51 was released on January 24, 2017, for both desktop and Android. Among the many additions were added support for FLAC (Free Lossless Audio Codec) playback, better Tab Switching, support for WebGL 2, and a warning that is displayed when a login page does not have a secure connection.

Firefox 52 through 59 

Firefox 52 and Firefox 52 ESR were released on March 7, 2017, for desktop (both) and Android (no ESR). An important aspect of Firefox ESR 52.0 is that it is the first ESR version based on Firefox Electrolysis (Firefox 48) code base. Firefox 52 added support for WebAssembly (while disabled in Firefox ESR 52), an emerging standard that brings near-native performance to Web-based games, apps, and software libraries without the use of plugins; automatic captive portal detection, for easier access to Wi-Fi hotspots; user warnings for insecure HTTP pages with logins (desktop); and display of media controls to pause or resume playback on the Android notification bar. Firefox 52 dropped support for NPAPI plugins like Microsoft Silverlight and Java with the exception of Adobe Flash Player (except the ESR version which still supports NPAPI).

Firefox 53 was released on April 19, 2017, for both desktop and Android. Starting with Firefox 53, Microsoft Windows support is exclusively for Windows 7 and above. Among the many additions are: improved graphics stability for Windows users with the addition of compositor process separation, light and dark "compact" themes available, based on the Firefox Developer Edition theme, removal of support for 32-bit macOS and Linux support for processors older than Pentium 4 and AMD Opteron; new visual design for audio and video controls, support for WebM video with alpha compositing, which allows playing videos with transparent backgrounds (desktop), Reader Mode displaying estimated reading time for the page (desktop and Android), and enabling two columns tabs setting in portrait mode (Android).

Firefox 54 was released on June 13, 2017, for both desktop and Android. Among the many additions are: simplifying the download button and download status panel, added support for multiple content processes, the ability to create and save custom devices in responsive web design mode (desktop), improved audio and video playback in the browser, and improved bookmarks sync performance (Android).

Firefox 55 was released on August 8, 2017, for both desktop and Android. Among the many additions are: the launch of Windows support for WebVR, bringing immersive experiences to the web, options that let users optimize recent performance improvements, simplification of the installation process with a streamlined Windows stub installer, improvements to address bar functionality, simplification of printing from Reader Mode (desktop), and the option for accessibility settings to respect the system's set font size when displaying web pages (Android). This is also the last version to support Android Ice Cream Sandwich.

Firefox 56 was released on September 28, 2017, for both desktop and Android. Among the many additions are: a new layout for the "Preferences" page, the launch of Firefox Screenshots, support for address form autofill, hardware acceleration for AES-GCM, update of the Safe Browsing protocol to version 4, improved security or verifying update downloads (desktop), improvement of support for WebExtensions, and the end of support for Adobe Flash (Android). Starting with this version, Android support is exclusively for Android Jelly Bean and above.

Another change was the introduction of the mozlz4 format, a proprietary variant of the lz4 compression format (.mozlz4 and .jsonlz4 file extensions instead of .json.lz4 as per unix/linux standard). Session data is stored in the lz4 format instead of plain text. Firefox 56 cannot recognize the legacy plain text session files, only the lz4-encoded ones.

Firefox 57 was released on November 14, 2017, for desktop and Android with the name Firefox Quantum. ZDNet dubbed it a "comeback" following years of falling market share against Google Chrome. The release included a new interface design, codenamed "Photon", and a new rendering engine almost twice as fast as the previous one used. One of the largest visual changes in Photon was the removal of the search box from the address bar. Firefox 57 no longer supports legacy add-ons using XUL technologies. That same day, Mozilla announced that Google would be the default search engine in the US and Canada, a departure from Yahoo, which had been the default search engine in the US and Canada since 2014.

Firefox 58 was released on January 23, 2018, for desktop and Android. Among the additions were: support for credit card autofill, the drop of support for user profiles in previous versions of Firefox, a warning to alert users and site owners of planned security changes to sites affected by the gradual distrust plan for the Symantec certificate authority (desktop), full screen bookmark management with folder support, support for FLAC (Free Lossless Audio Codec) playback, the ability to change the status bar color in themes, and removal of the Firefox Search widget from the home screen (Android).

Firefox 59 was released on March 13, 2018, for desktop and Android. Among the additions were: faster load times and improved graphics, improved Real-Time Communications (RTC) capabilities, additional features for Firefox Screenshots, support for W3C specs for pointer events, Private Browsing Mode's removal of path information from referrers to prevent cross-site tracking (desktop), and the addition of Firefox as an Assist app, support for HLS (HTTP Live Streaming) playback for improved compatibility with video sites, and removal of the "about:" page.

Firefox 60 through 67 

Firefox 60 and Firefox 60 ESR were released on May 9, 2018, for desktop (both) and Android (no ESR). It includes a policy engine that allows customized Firefox deployments in enterprise environments, using Windows Group Policy or a cross-platform JSON file, enhancements to New Tab / Firefox Home, a redesigned Cookies and Site Storage section in Preferences for greater clarity and control of first- and third-party cookies, the application of Quantum CSS to render browser UI, support for Web Authentication API, which allows USB tokens for website authentication, an option for Linux users to show or hide page titles in a bar at the top of the browser, improved WebRTC audio performance and playback for Linux users (desktop), exclusive support for extensions built using the WebExtension API (ESR), the implementation of Quantum CSS (also known as Stylo) in Android for faster page rendering; and the addition of the View Page Source option to the Page Action menu (Android).

Firefox 61 was released on June 26, 2018, for both desktop and Android. Among the many additions were: Improvements for dark theme support across the entire Firefox user interface, added support to allow WebExtensions to hide tabs, improved bookmark syncing, convenient access to more search engines (desktop), improved security and enhanced performances (both), and the fix for a recurring crash on Samsung Galaxy S8 devices running Android Oreo (Android).

Firefox 62 was released on September 5, 2018, for both desktop and Android. Among the many additions were: FreeBSD support for WebAuthn, a preference that allows users to distrust certificates issued by Symantec in advance of removing all trust for Symantec-issued certificates in Firefox 63, improved graphics rendering for Windows users without accelerated hardware using Parallel-Off-Main-Thread Painting, CSS Variable Fonts (OpenType Font Variations) support, support for CSS Shapes, allowing for richer web page layouts (desktop), improved scrolling performance, faster page load times over Wi-Fi connections by loading from the network cache if disk cache is slow, and "Product and feature tips" toggle in Notifications settings (Android). The bookmarks' Description field was deprecated and will be removed completely in future releases.

Firefox 63 was released on October 23, 2018, for both desktop and Android. Among the many additions and changes were: Performance and visual improvements for Windows and macOS users, content blocking, WebExtensions running in their own process in Linux, recognition of the operating system accessibility setting for reducing animation, the addition of Amazon and Google as Top Sites tiles on the Firefox Home (New Tab) page, the removal of the "Never Check for Updates" option from "about:preferences" and "Open in Sidebars" feature from the Library (desktop), support for Picture-In-Picture video, and use of notification channels (Android).

Firefox 64 version 64.0 was released on December 11, 2018, for desktop only. Firefox 64 for desktop provides better recommendations, enhanced tab management, easier performance management, improved performance for Mac and Linux users by enabling link time optimization (Clang LTO), more seamless sharing on Windows, the option to remove add-ons using the context menu on their toolbar buttons, TLS certificates issued by Symantec that are no longer trusted by Firefox, and the availability of WebVR on macOS. Three days later, version 64.0.1 was released for Android only. Firefox 64 for Android provides faster and more responsive scrolling and fixes for performance lags for users with installed password manager apps and an issue that resulted in the loading indicator using too much of the CPU and power.

Firefox 65 was released on January 29, 2019, for both desktop and Android. Among the many additions and changes were: improved performance and web compatibility, with support for the WebP image format; enhanced security for macOS, Linux, and Android users via stronger stack smashing protection which is now enabled by default for all platforms (both desktop and Android); enhanced tracking protection; updated language settings in Preferences; support for Handoff on macOS; a better video streaming experience for Windows users; easier performance management; an improved pop-up blocker; the availability of Firefox for Windows with 32- and 64-bit MSI installers for easier enterprise deployments; additional support for Flexbox (desktop); and the restoration of Chromecast controls to the location bar (Android).

Firefox 66 was released on March 19, 2019, for both desktop and Android. Among the many additions and changes were: Prevention of websites from automatically playing sound, smoother scrolling (both), an improved search experience and performance and better user experience for extensions, the addition of basic support for macOS Touch Bar and of support for Windows Hello on Windows 10, the enabling of AV1 support on 32-bit Windows and MacOS (desktop), and the addition of support to open files from external storage, such as an SD card (Android).

Firefox 67 was released on May 21, 2019, for both desktop and Android. Among the many additions and changes were: Lowering priority of setTimeout during page load; suspending (unloading) unused tabs to clear memory; the ability to block known cryptominers and fingerprinters in the Custom settings of the Content Blocking preferences; improvement of keyboard accessibility; usability and security improvements in Private Browsing; protection against running older versions of the browser which can lead to data corruption and stability issues (desktop); a new Firefox search widget with voice input; and removal of the Guest Session feature ostensibly to "streamline" user experience (Android).

Firefox 68 through 77 

Firefox 68 and Firefox 68 ESR were released on July 9, 2019, for desktop (both) and Android (no ESR). Among the many additions were: Expansion of Dark Mode in Reader view, a new reporting feature in about:addons, cryptomining and fingerprinting protections, WebRender for Windows 10, Windows Background Intelligent Transfer Service (BITS) update download support (desktop), user and enterprise added certificates read from the OS by default (68 ESR), improved web page painting performance by avoiding redundant calculations during paint, and introduction of WebAuthn (the Web Authentication API; Android).

Firefox 68.1 was released on September 3, 2019, for Android only, with the addition of on-by-default Enhanced Tracking Protection, which enabled users to benefit from protections against ad, social, and analytics trackers.

Firefox 69 was released on September 3, 2019, for desktop only. Among the additions were: Enhanced Tracking Protection; the Block Autoplay feature; support for the Web Authentication HmacSecret extension via Windows Hello for versions of Windows 10 May 2019 or newer; support for receiving multiple video codecs; JIT support for ARM64; and improvements for download UI, performance (Windows 10), and battery life (macOS).

Firefox 68.2 was released on October 22, 2019, for Android only, gaining the ability to sign in to a Firefox account from the onboarding experience as well as from the new tab page, and resolving a crash in the "Welcome" screen.

Firefox 70 was released on October 22, 2019, for desktop only. Among the additions were: more privacy protection from Enhanced Tracking Protection; more security protection from Firefox Lockwise; improvements to core engine components for better browsing on more sites; a stand-alone Firefox account menu for easy access to Firefox services like Monitor and Send; the dark mode preference for built-in Firefox pages; and inactive CSS.

Firefox 68.3 was released on December 3, 2019, for Android only, gaining the updates to improve performance and stability.

Firefox 71 was released on December 3, 2019, for desktop only. Among the additions were: improvements to the integrated password manager Lockwise; more information about Enhanced Tracking Protection in action; picture-in-picture for Windows; and native MP3 decoding on Windows, Linux, and macOS.

Firefox 68.4 was released on January 7, 2020, for Android only, gaining various security fixes.

Firefox 72 was released on January 7, 2020, for desktop only. Among the additions were: the replacement of notification request pop-ups; the ETP blocking fingerprinting scripts by default; the availability of picture-in-picture video for macOS and Linux; and the removal of support for blocking images from individual domains because of low usage and poor user experience.

Firefox 68.5 was released on February 11, 2020, for Android only, updating messaging card on the homescreen to inform users about upcoming releases and gaining various security and stability fixes.

Firefox 73 was released on February 11, 2020, for desktop only. Among the additions were: a new global default zoom level setting, a "readability backplate" solution which places a block of background color between the text and background image, improved audio quality when playing back audio at a faster or slower speed, a prompt to save logins if a field in a login form was modified, and rolling out WebRender to laptops with Nvidia graphics cards with drivers newer than 432.00, and screen sizes smaller than 1920x1200.

Firefox 68.6 was released on March 10, 2020, for Android only, gaining various security and stability fixes.

Firefox 74 was released on March 10, 2020, for desktop only. Additions included: improvement of login management with the ability to reverse alpha sort (Name Z-A) in Lockwise; simple importing of bookmarks and history from Microsoft Edge on Windows and Mac; use of Add-ons Manager to remove add-ons installed by external applications; Facebook Container, which prevents Facebook from tracking across the web; and support for mDNS ICE. Initially, this release was also the first with TLS 1.0 and 1.1 disabled. However, out of concern for access to information during the concurrent pandemic, this change was rolled back.

Firefox 68.7 was released on April 7, 2020, for Android only, gaining various security and stability fixes.

Firefox 75 was released on April 7, 2020, for desktop only. Additions included: a number of improvements with Firefox's revamped address bar; the local cache of all trusted Web PKI Certificate Authority certificates known to Mozilla; the availability of Firefox in Flatpak on Linux; and the integration of Direct Composition on Windows.

Firefox 68.8 was released on May 5, 2020, for Android only, gaining various security and stability fixes.

Firefox 76 was released on May 5, 2020, for desktop only. Additions included: strengthened protections for online account logins and passwords, with innovative approaches to managing accounts during this critical time; allowing multitasking in Picture-in-Picture; support for Audio Worklets that will allow more complex audio processing like VR and gaming on the web; and two updates to the address bar improving its usability and visibility.

Firefox 68.9 was released on June 2, 2020, for Android only, gaining various security and stability fixes.

Firefox 77 was released on June 2, 2020, for desktop only. Additions included: pocket recommendations on Firefox' new tab for UK users; a new about:certificate page; and the removal of the browser.urlbar.oneOffSearches preference.

Firefox 68.10 was released on June 30, 2020, for Android only, gaining various security and stability fixes.

Firefox 68.11 was released on July 27, 2020, for Android only, gaining various security and stability fixes. With the first stable release of Firefox Daylight (Fenix), Firefox 68.11 is the last release for Firefox for Android codenamed Fennec.

Firefox 78 through 90 

Firefox 78 and Firefox 78 ESR were released on June 30, 2020, for desktop. Among the many additions were: the Protections Dashboard, the addition of the Refresh button to the Uninstaller, a new WebRender rolled out to Windows users with Intel GPUs, the addition of Pocket Recommendations to users in the UK, the requirement of GNU libc 2.17, libstdc++ 4.8.1 and GTK+ 3.14 or newer versions on Linux, the disabling of TLS 1.0 and 1.1 and other improvements; and the addition of Kiosk Mode, client certificates, Service Worker and Push APIs, the Block Autoplay feature, picture-in-picture support, and the management of web certificates in about:certificate in 78 ESR.

Firefox 79 was released on July 28, 2020, for desktop, and on August 27 for Android. Among the many additions were: a new WebRender rolled out to Windows users with Intel and AMD GPUs, the addition of Pocket Recommendations to users in Germany, the fixes for several crashes while using a screen reader, and updates to the password policy (desktop); the enabling of Enhanced Tracking Protection by default, the ability to switch to Dark Mode, and video multitasking with Picture-in-Picture mode (Android).

Firefox 80 was released on August 25, 2020, for desktop, and on August 31 for Android. Among the many additions were: the setting as the default system PDF viewer; the new add-ons blocklist enabled to improve performance and scalability; support for RTX and Transport-cc for improved call quality in poor network conditions and better bandwidth estimation and better compatibility with many websites using WebRTC (desktop); and the return of the Back button (Android).

Firefox 81 was released on September 22, 2020, for desktop and Android. Among the many additions were: the ability to pause or play audio or video right from the keyboard or headset; the introduction of the Alpenglow theme; the ability to save, manage, and auto-fill credit card information for U.S. and Canada users; the support of Acroform, which allows users to fill in, print, and save supported PDF forms; the automatic revelation of the Bookmarks toolbar; the expansion of .xml, .svg, and .webp; and fixes for browser native HTML5 audio/video controls (desktop); and the introduction of Firefox Daylight (Android).

Firefox 82 was released on October 20, 2020, for desktop and Android. Among the many additions were: a number of improvements that make watching videos more delightful; improved performance on both page loads and start up time; saving a webpage to Pocket from the Firefox toolbar (desktop); the ability to automatically purge cookies from sites not visited in 30 days; and better support for opening links in Firefox from third-party apps (Android).

Firefox 83 was released on November 17, 2020, for desktop and Android. Among the many additions were: significant updates to SpiderMonkey and JavaScript engine and replacement of the part of the JavaScript engine that helps to compile and display websites for the user; the introduction of the HTTPS-Only Mode; the support of pinch zooming for users with Windows touchscreen devices and touchpads on Mac devices; support of keyboard shortcuts for fast forwarding and rewinding videos in Picture-in-Picture; improved user interface; improved functionality and design for a number of Firefox search features; support of Acroform (desktop); and newly supported add-ons: FoxyProxy, Bitwarden, AdGuard AdBlocker, Tomato Clock, LeechBlock NG, Web Archives, and Ghostery (Android).

Firefox 84 was released on December 15, 2020, for desktop and Android. Among the many additions were: native support for macOS devices built with Apple silicon CPUs; the rollout of WebRender to MacOS Big Sur, Windows devices with Intel Gen 6 GPUs, and Intel laptops running Windows 7 and 8, and an accelerated rendering pipeline for Linux/GNOME/X11 users for the first time; the use of more modern techniques for allocating shared memory on Linux, improving performance and increasing compatibility with Docker (desktop); the option to view open tabs side by side in a grid view; the ability to delete downloaded files within the app; the rollout of WebRender to more users on the Mali-G GPU series; and improvement of scrolling accuracy and control and fix of cases of unexpected scroll acceleration (Android).

Firefox 85 was released on January 26, 2021, for desktop and Android. Among the many additions were: protection from supercookies, a type of tracker that can stay hidden in the browser and track users online, even after they have cleared cookies; the ability to save and access bookmarks more easily; the ability of the password manager to have users remove all their saved logins with one click, as opposed to having to delete each login individually; the removal of Adobe Flash support; and added support for the :focus-visible pseudo class (desktop).

Firefox 86 was released on February 23, 2021, for desktop and Android. Among the many additions were: added support for simultaneously watching multiple videos in Picture-in-Picture; improved Print functionality with a cleaner design and better integration with the computer's printer settings; credit card management and auto-fill for users in Canada; notable performance and stability improvements achieved by moving canvas drawing and WebGL drawing to the GPU process; the removal of DTLS 1.0 support or establishing WebRTC's PeerConnections (desktop), and the introduction of Total Cookie Protection to Strict Mode (both).

Firefox 87 was released on March 23, 2021, for desktop and Android. Among the many additions and removals were: the addition of SmartBlock, which provides stand-in scripts so that websites load properly; the new default HTTP Referrer policy (both); the improved "Highlight All" feature on Find in Page; full support for macOS built-in screen reader, VoiceOver; the disabling of the Backspace key as a navigation shortcut for the back navigation button; and the removal of Synced tabs, Recent highlights, and Pocket list from the Library menu (desktop); and the rollout of WebRender to more devices, with the following mobile GPUs now supported: Adreno 505, Adreno 506, Mali-T (Android).

Firefox 88 was released on April 19, 2021, for desktop and Android. Among the many additions and removals were: PDF forms supporting JavaScript embedded in PDF files; localized margin units; smooth pinch-zooming using a touchpad on Linux; isolation of window.name data to the website that created it; the removal of the "Take a Screenshot" feature from the Page Actions menu in the url bar; the disabling of FTP support; a new toggle button in the Network panel for switching between JSON formatted HTTP response and raw data (desktop); and a search engine suggestion feature (Android).

Firefox 89 was released on June 1, 2021, for desktop and Android. Among the many additions and removals were: core experience redesigned and remodernized to be cleaner, more inviting, and easier to use; simplified browser chrome and toolbar; clear, streamlined menus; updated prompts; inspired tab design; reduced number of alerts and messages; lighter iconography, a refined color palette, and more consistent styling throughout; enhancement of privacy of Private Browsing Mode with Total Cookie Protection; the introduction of the elastic overscroll effect known from many other applications for macOS users; added support for smart zoom; native context menus on macOS (desktop); Synced Tabs in the Tabs tray; compact menu (Android); support of Event Timing API; and support of the CSS forced-colors media query (both).

Firefox 90 was released on July 13, 2021, for desktop and Android. Among the many additions and removals were: the application of updates in the background when Firefox is not running on Windows; a new page called about:third-party to help identify compatibility issues caused by third-party applications in Windows; the management of exceptions to HTTPS-Only mode in about:preferences#privacy; working hyperlinks in "Print to PDF"; Version 2 of Firefox's SmartBlock feature; the addition of software WebRender for most users without its hardware accelerated version; improved software WebRender performance; removal of FTP support; support for Private Fields in DevTools; support for Fetch Metadata Request Headers; the ability to use client authentication certificates stored in hardware tokens or in Operating System storage (desktop); the ability to save, manage, and auto-fill credit card information for users shopping on Firefox; and Back/Forward Cache (aka BFCache) for webpages that use unload event listeners (Android).

Firefox 91 through 101 

Firefox 91 and Firefox 91 ESR were released on August 10, 2021, for desktop and Android. Among the many additions and removals were: a build on Total Cookie Protection; support for logging into Microsoft, work, and school accounts using Windows single sign-on; the return of the Simplify page when printing feature; the addition of a new Scots locale; the address bar providing Switch to Tab results in Private Browsing windows; the automatic enable of High Contrast Mode when "Increase Contrast" is checked on MacOS; catch-up paints for almost all user interactions (desktop); the support of Javascript embedded in PDF files; the addition of SmartBlock; protection from supercookies; support of AcroForm; the removal of support for Adobe Flash (ESR); a “Set Firefox as your default browser” message on notification pane for new installs; the addition of eBay Search to help users with their shopping needs; and default autoplay setting updated to Blocking Audio Only (Android).

Firefox 92 was released on September 7, 2021, for desktop and Android. Among the many additions and removals were: an automatic upgrade to HTTPS using HTTPS RR as Alt-Svc headers; support of full-range color levels for video playback on many systems; support for images containing ICC v4 profiles on macOS; access of macOS share options from the Firefox File menu; the redesign of certificate error pages for better user experience (desktop); and added support for Web Authentication API, which allows USB tokens (such as the use of USB or Bluetooth Security Key) for website authentication (Android).

Firefox 93 was released on October 5, 2021, for desktop and Android. Among the many additions and removals were: support for the new AVIF image format, which is based on the modern and royalty free AV1 video codec; support for filling more forms for PDF viewer; automatic unload of tabs based on their last access time, memory usage, and other attributes for Windows when available system memory is critically low; blocking downloads that rely on insecure connections, protecting against potentially malicious or unsafe downloads; improved web compatibility for privacy protections with SmartBlock 3.0; a new referrer tracking protection in Strict Tracking Protection and Private Browsing; disabling of TLS ciphersuites that use 3DES (desktop); the addition of forward, back, and reload buttons in the toolbar on tablets; the auto-fill of logins and passwords by default; and the merging of site security and privacy info into one icon (Android).

Firefox 94 was released on November 2, 2021, for desktop and Android. Among the many additions and removals were: a selection of six fun seasonal Colorways (available for a limited time only); the usage of Apple's low power mode for fullscreen video on sites such as YouTube and Twitch; the addition of about:unloads; fewer interruptions on Windows because of a background agent that will download and install updates even if Firefox is closed; improved WebGL performance and reduced power consumption for Linux users; the introduction of Site Isolation to better protect all users against side-channel attacks; support for the new Snap Layouts menus when running on Windows 11; reduced CPU usage during socket polling for HTTPS connections; faster storage initialization; improved cold startup by reducing main thread I/O (desktop); and the new Inactive Tabs feature (Android).

Firefox 95 was released on December 7, 2021, for desktop and Android. Among the many additions and removals were: RLBox, a new technology that hardens Firefox against potential security vulnerabilities in third-party libraries; the addition of Firefox download from the Microsoft Store on Windows 10 and 11; reduced CPU usage on macOS in Firefox and WindowServer during event processing; reduced power usage of software decoded video on macOS, especially in fullscreen; the ability to move the Picture-in-Picture toggle button to the opposite side of the video; the enabling of Site Isolation; a User Agent override for Slack.com, which allows Firefox users to use more Call features and have access to Huddles (desktop); the new “Homepage” section in the Settings Menu; Hero Images in the "Jump Back In" section; confirmation of snack bar “Auto-close enabled” when a user enables auto-close from the tab tray; and support of Pocket (Thought Provoking Stories section) in Canada.

Firefox 96 was released on January 11, 2022, for desktop and Android. Among the many additions and removals were: significant improvements in noise-suppression and auto-gain-control as well as slight improvements in echo-cancellation; reduced main-thread load; the default of all cookies to having a SameSite=lax attribute which helps defend against Cross-Site Request Forgery (CSRF) attacks; the selection of printing odd/even pages (desktop); history highlights to recently visited sites; the display of better images for recent bookmarks on the home page; and improved "fill link from clipboard for Android 12 (Android).

Firefox 97 was released on February 8, 2022, for desktop and Android. Among the many additions and removals were: support and display for the new style of scrollbars on Windows 11; improvements to system font loading which makes opening and switching to new tabs faster in certain situations for macOS; removal of the 18 colorway themes of Firefox 94; removal of support for directly generating PostScript for printing on Linux, with the exception of printing to Postscript printers (desktop); and the addition of a new prompt when users attempt to leave private browsing with active downloads (Android).

Firefox 98 was released on March 8, 2022, for desktop and Android. Among the many additions were: a new optimized download flow, in which, instead of prompting every time, files will download automatically; allowing users to choose from a number of built-in search engines to set as their default (desktop); the ability to change Wallpapers on Homepage; and the ability to clear cookies and website data for a single domain (Android).

Firefox 99 was released on April 5, 2022, for desktop and Android. Among the many additions were: the ability to toggle Narrate in ReaderMode with the keyboard shortcut "n"; added support for search—with or without diacritics—in the PDF viewer; support for credit card autofill and capture in Germany and France (desktop); the ability to clear cookies and data for a single domain; and improved performance of Pocket articles on the homescreen (Android).

Firefox 100 was released on May 3, 2022, for desktop and Android. Among the many additions were: support for captions/subtitles display on YouTube, Amazon Prime Video, and Netflix videos watched in Picture-in-Picture, which now supports video captions on websites that use WebVTT (Web Video Text Track) format, like Coursera.org, Canadian Broadcasting Corporation, and many more; support for HDR video on macOS; hardware accelerated AV1 video decoding on Windows with supported GPUs; video overlay on Windows for Intel GPUs, reducing power usage during video playback; improved fairness between painting and handling other events, support for credit card autofill and capture in the UK; support for profiling multiple java threads (desktop); updated History; and bookmark search (Android).

Firefox 101 was released on May 31, 2022, for desktop and Android. Among the many additions were: the prefers-contrast media query, which allows sites to detect if the user has requested that web content is presented with a higher (or lower) contrast; all non-configured MIME types that can now be assigned a custom action upon download completion; the use of as many microphones at the same time, during video conferencing; added support for large, small, dynamic viewport units and logical ones (*vi and *vb); added web conferencing support for enumerating and selecting multiple audio input devices through navigator.mediaDevices.enumerateDevices() (desktop); and added support for using the magnifier on Android 9+ for positioning the cursor in forms on web pages (Android).

Firefox 102 through 114 
Firefox 102 and Firefox 102 ESR were released on June 28, 2022, for desktop and Android. Among the many additions and removals were: the ability to disable automatic opening of the download panel every time a new download starts; the mitigation of query parameter tracking when navigating sites in ETP strict mode; the availability of subtitles and captions for Picture-in-Picture (PiP) at HBO Max, Funimation, Dailymotion, Tubi, Disney+ Hotstar, and SonyLIV; improved security by moving audio decoding into a separate process with stricter sandboxing, thus improving process isolation; the ability to filter style sheets in the Style Editor tab of developer tools; TransformStream and ReadableStream.pipeThrough being transferable along with WritableStream; support for Content-Security-Policy (CSP) integration with WebAssembly (desktop); and credit card autofill request to save and update card information when filling out forms (Android).

Firefox 103 was released on July 26, 2022, for desktop and Android. Among the many additions and removals were: improved responsiveness on macOS during periods of high CPU load by switching to a modern lock API; required fields highlighted in PDF forms; improved performance on high-refresh rate monitors (120Hz+); improved Picture-in-Picture subtitles, which are now available at Funimation, Dailymotion, Tubi, Hotstar, and SonyLIV; buttons in the Tabs toolbar reachable with Tab, Shift+Tab, and Arrow keys; Windows' "Make text bigger" accessibility setting now affecting all the UI and content pages, rather than only applying to system font sizes; the browser getting pinned to the Windows taskbar during installation on Windows 10 and 11; and the removal of a configuration option to allow SHA-1 signatures in certificates, which are not supported (desktop).

Firefox 104 was released on August 23, 2022, for desktop and Android. Among the many additions and removals were: the availability of subtitles for Disney+ in Picture-in-Picture; support for both the scroll-snap-stop property as well as re-snapping; the ability of the Firefox profiler to analyze power usage of a website for Apple M1 and Windws 11 only, while the Firefox UI itself will now be throttled for performance and battery usage when minimized or occluded, in the same way background tabs are (desktop); and the additions of "Address Autofill" and "Delete recent history" (Android).

Firefox 105 was released on September 20, 2022, for desktop and Android. Among the many additions and removals were: an option to print only the current page from the print preview dialog; support for partitioned service workers in third-party contexts; a swipe to navigate (two fingers on a touchpad swiped left or right to perform history back or forward) on Windows; compliance with the User Timing L3 specification, which adds additional optional arguments to the performance.mark and performance.measure methods to provide custom start times, end times, duration, and attached details; faster searching in large lists for individual items, which replaces array.includes and array.indexOf with an optimized SIMD version; support for the Offscreen Canvas DOM API with full context and font support (desktop); and updated interface font to use the Android default font.

Firefox 106 was released on October 18, 2022, for desktop and Android. Among the many additions and removals were: the possibility to edit PDFs: including writing text, drawing, and adding signatures; the ability to become the default PDF application on Windows systems on setting Firefox as the default browser; the ability to pin the Windows taskbar on Windows 10 and 11 for simpler access; the redesign of private windows to increase the feeling of privacy; swipe-to-navigate (two fingers on a touchpad swiped left or right to perform history back or forward) for Linux users on Wayland; Text Recognition in images for users of macOS 10.15 and higher; the addition of "Firefox View"; the introduction of 18 new Colorways with the launch of "Independent Voices" collection; major upgrade to WebRTC capabilities (desktop); wallpapers for the "Independent Voices" collection; and the appearances of recent sync tabs in the "Jump Back In" section of the homepage (Android).

Firefox 107 was released on November 15, 2022, for desktop and Android. Among the many additions and removals were: improved performance of the instance when Microsoft's IME and Defender retrieve the URL of a focused document in Windows 11 version 22H2; support of power profiling (visualizing performance data recorded from web browsers) on Linux and Mac with Intel CPUs, in addition to Windows 11 and Apple Silicon; a couple of helpful improvements in DevTools making it easier to debug WebExtensions, with a new argument allowing users to automatically open DevTools just in case, and a Reload button in the DevTools toolbox to see the changes (desktop); the availability of Total Cookie Protection; enabled text selection magnifier for website text; and added support for Android image keyboards (Android).

Firefox 108 was released on December 13, 2022, for desktop and Android. Among the many additions and removals were: enabling by default of import maps, which allow web pages to control the behavior of JavaScript imports; processes used for background tabs getting the use of efficiency mode on Windows 11 to limit resource use; the ability to open the Process manager via the Shift+Esc keyboard shortcut; improved frame scheduling when under load; support for properly color correcting images tagged with ICCv4 profiles; support for the WebMIDI API and a new experimental mechanism for controlling access to dangerous capabilities (desktop); the ability to save web pages as PDF files to conveniently access them later from the Downloads folder; the ability to organize tabs in the tabs tray by long-pressing on a tab; and the ability to open all bookmarks in a folder in new or private tabs (Android).

Firefox 109 was released on January 17, 2023, for desktop and Android. Among the many additions and removals were: the enabling of Manifest Version 3 (MV3) extension support by default; the enabling of the Arbitrary Code Guard exploit protection in the media playback utility processes; the native HTML date picker for date and datetime inputs being used with a keyboard alone; a built-in dictionary for the Firefox spellchecker for builds in the Spanish and Argentine Spanish locales; and the removal of Colorways (desktop).

Firefox 110 was released on February 14, 2023, for desktop and Android. Among the many additions and removals were: the possibility to import bookmarks, history and passwords not only from Edge, Chrome or Safari but also from Opera, Opera GX, and Vivaldi for all the folks who want to move over to Firefox instead; the enabling of GPU sandboxing on Windows; the ability to block third-party modules from injecting themselves into the browser; the ability to clear date, time, and datetime-local input fields; the enabling of GPU-accelerated Canvas2D by default on macOS and Linux; WebGL performance improvement on Windows, MacOS and Linux; enabled overlay of hardware-decoded video with non-Intel GPUs on Windows 10/11, improving video playback performance and video scaling quality; Colorways no longer available in the same way; support for CSS named pages, allowing web pages to perform per-page layout and add page-breaks in a declarative manner when printing; support for CSS size container queries (desktop); support for Android themed app icons in Android 13+; and improved selection magnifier placement when selecting text over several lines (Android).

Firefox 111 was released on March 14, 2023, for desktop and Android. Among the many additions and removals were: the enabling of Windows native notifications; the ability for Firefox Relay users to opt-in to create Relay email masks directly from the credential manager; the Silhe Friulian (fur) and Sardinian (sc) locales; support of the use of the rel attribute on form elements, allowing the specification of the relationship between the current document and the form target in a simpler, cross-browser way; the enabling of Origin private file system access, a new storage API that enables web applications to store and retrieve data from and to the filesystem in a sandbox (desktop); the ability for users to view PDF documents as they browse; the addition of Total Cookie Protection to Enhanced Tracking Protection's Strict Mode; the ability to share links to recently viewed web content directly from the Recents screen on Pixel devices running Android 12 or higher; and a security change in how Open in app and Android intents behave (Android).

Firefox 115 through 123

CPU architectures

x86 family 
Native 64-bit builds are officially supported on Linux, macOS, and Windows (since version 42).

Mozilla made Firefox for 64-bit Linux a priority with the release of Firefox 4, labeling it as tier 1 priority. Since being labeled tier 1, Mozilla has been providing official 64-bit releases for its browser for Linux. Vendor-backed 64-bit support has existed for Linux distributions such as Novell/SUSE Linux, Red Hat Enterprise Linux, and Ubuntu prior to Mozilla's 64-bit support, even though vendors were faced with the challenge of having to turn off the 64-bit JIT compiler due to its instability prior to Firefox 4.

The official releases of Firefox for macOS are universal builds that include both 32-bit and 64-bit versions of the browser in one package, and have been this way since Firefox 4. A typical browsing session uses a combination of the 64-bit browser process and a 32-bit plugin process, because some popular plugins still are 32-bit. As of April 19, 2017, Firefox 53 has dropped support for 32-bit macOS.

The 32-bit and 64-bit versions of Windows can be used to run 32-bit Firefox. In late 2012, Mozilla announced 64-bit Windows builds would be stopped but later reversed the decision. , 64-bit Windows builds are available as 38.0 Beta and newer. 64-bit builds for Windows are officially supported as of November 2015 with the release of Firefox 42.

Other CPU architectures 
Besides x86, Firefox also supported other CPU architectures including ARMv7, SPARC, PowerPC, and 68k on different tiers. Mozilla terminated support for PowerPC-based Macintosh computers with Firefox 3.6, but a third-party project known as TenFourFox ported several newer versions of Firefox, the latest being based on Firefox 45 ESR.

Mozilla Firefox timeline

Release compatibility

See also

 Timeline of web browsers
 GNU IceCat
 History of free and open-source software
 History of Mozilla Application Suite
 Debian–Mozilla trademark dispute

Explanatory notes

References

Further reading

 Eich, Brendan (2005). "Branch Plan". Mozilla Wiki. Retrieved December 21, 2005.

External links
 Mozilla Firefox release notes for each version
 Mozilla Firefox developer release notes for each version
 Releases from MozillaWiki
 History of the Mozilla logo by Jamie Zawinski
 
 Firefox browser for web 2.0 age, BBC News

Firefox
Firefox
Firefox
Firefox